The Alabama State Board of Education is a nine-member body which sets and authorizes the education policy for the state of Alabama for K-12 schools. The state has a separate appointed board that administers the Alabama Community College System. The governor is the ex officio president of the K-12 board and has voting privileges on all matters, although they are seldom exercised. The remaining eight members are elected to four-year terms in partisan elections from single-member districts of approximately equal population. However, most issues before the board are not necessarily considered as partisan in nature. There is no limit on the number of terms to which members may be elected. Members in Districts 1, 3, 5, and 7 are elected in the same cycle as the President of the United States. Members in Districts 2, 4, 6, and 8 are elected in the same cycle as the Governor of Alabama, with their most recent election occurring in 2018. The eight single-member districts are re-drawn by the Alabama Legislature following each di-cennial U.S. Census.

Alabama is currently one of six states that has an elected state school board. The other states with elected boards are Colorado, Michigan, Missouri, Oregon, and Texas. A seventh state, Ohio has a board that is a combination of elected and appointed members.

Officers of the board
A President Pro Tem and a Vice President are chosen among the eight board members each year to lead board meetings in the absence of the governor. Of the current eight members, six are Republicans and two are Democrats. Six of the board members are female, two of which are African-American (Ms. Richardson and Ms. Ella Bell) and two are male (Mr. Newman and Mr. Reynolds). A state Superintendent of Education is appointed by the board to serve as its secretary and executive officer, although he has no vote on issues before the Board.

History
The first African-American to serve on the Alabama State Board of Education was Peyton Finley (1871–1873) from Lafayette in Chambers County who was "free-born" from birth in 1824. Active in the Republican Party after the Civil War, during the Reconstruction era, he served a single term on the State School Board. Among his contributions was the introduction of a measure to the board to create Alabama's first institution of higher-learning for blacks. It was first located in Marion in Perry County and initially called the Lincoln Normal School. In 1887, it was re-located to Montgomery and renamed. Today, it is the nation's third-oldest HBCU (historically black colleges and universities), Alabama State University. The first African-American woman to serve on the Alabama State Board was Democrat Ethel H. Hall (1987–2011) of Fairfield, Jefferson County.

One recent board member was Al Thompson; he was appointed to a vacancy on the board by Governor Robert Bentley in June of 2014, but he resigned in mid-2015 to take a similar position on the new governing body of the Alabama two-year college system. Governor Bentley replaced him with Matthew Brown of Fairhope in Baldwin County on July 16, 2015. Thompson and Brown successively followed board member Tracy Roberts who had resigned for undisclosed personal reasons after one and one-half years on the board. Mr. Brown was defeated for re-nomination by Jackie Ziegler on April 12, 2016, but remained as a member of the Board until his term expired in January, 2017.

From the end of Reconstruction until 1986, no Republicans were elected to the Alabama State Board of Education. That year, Spencer Bachus (1987–1991) won 57% of the vote in District 6, dislodging a 26-year Democratic incumbent and becoming the first Republican on the Board in over 100 years. In 1998, the GOP won four of the eight elected seats and achieved a majority in 2008. Democrats usually no longer contest the six Republican held seats and the GOP did not contest either of the black-majority Democrat held seats at the last elections in 2018.

2020 board elections and failed constitutional amendment
There was a recent vacancy on the board due to the death of District 5 member Ella Bell (2001–2019) who died on November 3, 2019, shortly before qualifying closed for the seat.  On January 7, 2020, Governor Kay Ivey appointed Dr. Tommie Stewart for the remainder of the unexpired term.   She will only serve through the general election in November, 2020.   

Both parties have contested Seats 1 and 3 with GOP incumbents seeking re-election and one Democrat qualifying in each race. In the Seat 5 race held by Dr. Tommie Stewart, ten Democrats qualified for the Democratic party nomination and one Republicans qualified. Therefore, the winner of the Democratic primary for District 5 will face the Republican nominee, Lesa Keith in the General Election in November, 2020. In District 7, the incumbent Jeffrey Newman did not seek re-nomination and only Republican Belinda Palmer McRae qualified for the seat in either major party. Ms. McRae will also be elected in November, 2020.

In the Regular Session of the Alabama Legislature in 2019, it passed a proposed constitutional amendment to abolish the current eight elected School Board members and replace them with an eight-member Commission appointed by the Governor and confirmed by the State Senate. That measure went to the voters in the March 3, 2020 primary and was overwhelmingly defeated by a three to one margin. Should that amendment have passed, the existing board would have been abolished before the new members from Districts 5 and 7 would assume their seats. The proposed amendment would have further changed the current members from "representing the voters" to Commission members whose appointment would be contingent upon "representing the racial composition of the student population" in Alabama. This will have altered the racial composition of the board from its current 2 minority seats of the eight to being three of the eight Commission members with the further stipulation that the 3 minority members be chosen by the Governor from a list of names submitted to the Governor from members of the Legislative Black Caucus.  African-American voters also rejected this attempt to remove their "right to vote" . The Governor would be unrestricted in the other five appointments.

Board members
Members of the board include:
President (The Governor of Alabama) - Kay Ivey
Superintendent/Secretary - Dr. Eric Mackey 
Board Members:
District 1: Jackie Zeigler, (R) (2017–present) 
District 2: Tracie West, (R) (2019–present)
District 3: Stephanie W. Bell, (R) (1995–present)
District 4: Dr. Yvette M. Richardson, (D) (2011–present)
District 5: Dr. Tommie Stewart (2020–2020)
District 6: Dr. Cynthia S. McCarty, (R) (2015–present)
District 7: Jeffrey Newman, (R) (2013–present)
District 8: Wayne Reynolds, (R) (2019–present)

Past board members (partial list)
Spencer Bachus (R) (1987–1991)
Ella B. Bell (D) (2001–2019)
Matthew Brown (R) (2015–2017)
Dr. David F. Byers, Jr. (R) (1995–2011)
Bradley Byrne (R) (1999–2005)
Mary Jane Caylor (D) (1995–2011)
Dan Cleckler (D) (1991–1999)
Bettye Fine Collins (R) (1991–1995)
Dr. Charles E. Elliott (R) (2011–2015)
Peyton Findley (R) (1871–1873)
Ethel H. Hall (D) (1987–2011)
G. J. "Dutch" Higginbotham (D)(R) (1995–2003)
Mary Scott Hunter (R) (2011–2019)
Howard C. Martin (D) (1963–1987)
Randy McKinney (R) (2005–2013)
Willie J. Paul (D)1987–2003)
Betty Peters (R) (2003–2019)
Victor Poole (D) (1963–1995)
Sandra Ray (D) (1995–2009)
Tracy Roberts (R) (2013–2014)
Steadman S. Shealy, Jr. (D) (1987–1995)
Tazewell Shepard (D) (1991–1995)
Isabelle B. Thomasson (D) (1987–1995)
Al Thompson (R) (2014–2015)
John Tyson, Jr. (D) (1981–1995)
Gary B. Warren (R) (2009–2013)

Superintendent
Today the board is responsible for appointing the superintendent who also serves at the pleasure of the board. However, when the Alabama Legislature first passed legislation creating a state public education system in 1854, it was the Legislature who appointed the Superintendent for a term of two years.   They appointed Mr. W. F. Perry, who held the position for four years.  The most recent superintendent was Michael Sentance, who resigned on September 12, 2017. Former Superintendent, Dr. Ed Richardson was named Interim Superintendent by the Board on September 14, 2017. He can serve up to two full six month terms during which time the Board will search for a permanent replacement. Dr. Eric Mackey was named as the 37th Superintendent in state history in a 5–4 vote by the Board on April 20, 2018. Dr. Mackey was at the time Executive Director of the Alabama Association of School Superintendents.

Past superintendents (partial list)
W. F. Perry (1854–1858)
Austin R. Meadows (1954–1963?)
Ernest Stone (1967)
Dr. Leroy Brown (1971–1975)
Dr. Wayne Teague (1975–1995)
Dr. Ed Richardson (1995–2004)
Dr. Joseph B. Morton (2004–2011)
Dr. Thomas R. Bice (2011–2016)
Dr. Phillip Cleveland (2016) (Interim)
Michael Sentance (2016–2017)
Dr. Ed Richardson (2017–2018) (Interim)

See also
Alabama Department of Education

Notes

External links
 Board of Education Website

Public education in Alabama
Alabama
Educational organizations based in Alabama